Elizabeth Khaxas (born 1960) is a Namibian writer and activist. 

Khaxas ran Sister Namibia from 1998 to 2004. After leaving Sister Namibia, she founded the Women's Leadership Centre. 

Khaxas and her partner were also part of the Frank and Khaxas v Chairperson of the Immigration Selection Board court case in Namibia, which tried to obtain legal recognition of same-sex relationships in Namibia.

References

Further reading 
 

1960 births
Feminist writers
Lesbian feminists
Lesbian writers
Namibian LGBT people
Living people
Namibian feminists
Namibian writers